Northeast Pama–Nyungan, or Pama–Maric, is a hypothetical language family consisting of the following neighboring branches of the Pama–Nyungan family of Australian languages:

Paman
Dyirbalic
Yidinyic
Yalanjic
Maric

Geographically, the Lower Burdekin languages might be assumed to be NE Pama–Nyungan, and perhaps Paman. However, they are too poorly attested to classify.

The hypothesis has been largely abandoned in recent classifications.

 
Indigenous Australian languages in Queensland